Cybalomia albilinealis is a moth in the family Crambidae. It is found in Yemen.

References

Cybalomiinae
Moths described in 1896
Moths of the Middle East